Löttorp is a locality situated in Borgholm Municipality, Kalmar County, Sweden with 438 inhabitants in 2010. It is connected to the church village Högby on Route 136.

It has an elementary and middle school, and a library.

See also
Vedborm

References

External links 

Populated places in Borgholm Municipality